"Simango" is the surname of the following persons:
 Uria Simango (born 15 March 1926), Mozambican Presbyterian minister and prominent leader of the Mozambique Liberation Movement Frelimo
 Daviz Simango (1964–2021), Mozambican politician and President of the Democratic Movement of Mozambique (MDM), son of Uria Simango
 David Simango, mayor of the town of Maputo in Mozambique